Daona is a genus of moths of the family Noctuidae.

Species
 Daona constellans Lucas, 1898
 Daona detersalis Walker, [1866]
 Daona mansueta Walker, 1864

References
 Daona at Markku Savela's Lepidoptera and Some Other Life Forms
 Natural History Museum Lepidoptera genus database

Calpinae
Moth genera